F. est un salaud (English title F. Is a Bastard or Fögi Is a Bastard, released in German as De Fögi isch en Souhund) is a 1998 French/Swiss film based upon the novel ter fögi isch e souhung by Martin Frank.  It was filmed in Zürich, Switzerland.  The setting is the early 1970s, Zurich. The film was shown in 1999 at the Locarno Film Festival, the Toronto International Film Festival, and the 1998 Toronto International Film Festival.

Plot summary
Beni, age 15, becomes enamoured with the lead singer of the struggling rock band "The Minks", Fögi Müller, who is ten years older than him.  Fögi ensnares him with the perceived glamor of being a musician, takes him on as the band's 'roadie', and at the same time seduces him.  Beni unquestionably follows him, including following him into drug addiction.  Beni's youthful innocence is destroyed in a milieu of sex, drinking, drugs, and rock-and-roll. He ends up prostituting himself to pay for Fögi's drug habit.

Primary cast
 Frédéric Andrau	... 	Fögi
 Vincent Branchet	... 	Beni Müller
 Urs Peter Halter	... 	Töbe
 Jean-Pierre von Dach	... 	Wäde

See also
List of lesbian, gay, bisexual or transgender-related films

References

External links

1990s French-language films
1998 films
1998 drama films
French LGBT-related films
Swiss LGBT-related films
Films about child sexual abuse
LGBT-related drama films
1998 LGBT-related films
French-language Swiss films
1990s French films